Tartar was built in Spain in 1784, almost certainly under another name. She was taken in prize and appears under British ownership in 1799. She became a slave ship sailing from Liverpool in the triangular trade in enslaved people. She was captured in late 1799 on her first slave trading voyage before she was able to embark any slaves.

Career
Captain John Sowerby acquired a letter of marque on 22 May 1799. Tartar sailed from Liverpool on 4 July 1799. At some point her master changed to Hewitt. Tartar never appeared in Lloyd's Register and only appeared in the Register of Shipping (RS) in 1800.

In late 1799 three French frigates captured Tartar, Hewitt, master, on the Windward Coast, together with three other slavers. The French put the crews aboard Diana and sent her back to Liverpool. A later report stated that the French sank Tartar, Enterprise, and Dispatch. Tartars entry in the Register of Shipping bears the annotation "captured".

In 1799, 18 British enslaving ships were lost; seven were lost on their way to Africa. During the period 1793 to 1807, war, rather than maritime hazards or resistance by the captives, was the greatest cause of vessel losses among British slave vessels.

Citations

References

1784 ships
Ships built in Spain
Captured ships
Age of Sail merchant ships of England
Liverpool slave ships